Sixkiller is a Cherokee surname. Notable people with the surname include:

Sam Sixkiller (1842–1886), Native American leader
Sonny Sixkiller (born 1951), American football player and sports commentator

Native American surnames